Chrysocercops neobalanocarpi is a moth of the family Gracillariidae. It is known from Negeri Sembilan, Malaysia.

The wingspan is 5.3–5.5 mm.

The larvae feed on Neobalanocarpus heimii. They mine the leaves of their host plant.

References

Chrysocercops
Moths described in 1992